Rusumo, is a town in Kirehe District in the  Eastern Province of Rwanda.

Location
The coordinates of the town are:2°22'50.0"S, 30°46'38.0"E (Latitude:-2.380553; Longitude:30.777210).

Overview
Rusumo is a border town, sitting at the border with neighboring Tanzania. In January 2015, the completed one-stop border post was opened to the public. Customs and immigration officials from both countries clear travelers once, in the country they are exiting. This cuts down on time spent at the border and allows from more travelers to be processed, with less hassle. The border post was officially jointly commissioned by the presidents of both countries on Wednesday, 6 April 2016.

Rusumo lies immediately west of Rusumo Falls, on the Kagera River, near the site where the proposed Rusumo Hydroelectric Power Station is currently under construction.

References

External links

Eastern Province, Rwanda
Kirehe District
Populated places in Rwanda
Cities in the Great Rift Valley